Shaiborlang Kharpan (born 19 August 1995) is an Indian professional footballer who plays as a forward for Rajasthan United in the I-League.

Career

Shillong Lajong
Kharpan is an youth product of Shillong Lajong. He was graduated to the senior team at the start of the 2013–14 season. He made his professional debut on 14 December 2013 against Sporting Goa at the Duler Stadium, Mapusa, Goa in which he came on as a substitute for Redeem Tlang in the 67th minute as Shillong Lajong lost the match 5–1.

Kerala Blasters
On 2017, he joined Kerala Blasters B scoring 7 goals in 10 matches. Having such an amazing season Ozone picked him up on loan the season after that scoring 3 in 6 matches. 2020 was good start for him as he was moved to the senior team.

Rajasthan United
In July 2022, I-League outfit Rajasthan United completed the permanent signing of Kharpan on a three-year deal.

International
Kharpan was a part of the India U-19 team which participated in the 2014 AFC U-19 Championship qualification held at Qatar in 2013 October where he played 3 matches.

Career statistics

Club

References

External links 
 Goal Profile

1995 births
Living people
Indian footballers
Shillong Lajong FC players
Association football forwards
Footballers from Meghalaya
I-League players
India youth international footballers
Kerala Blasters FC players
I-League 2nd Division players
Ozone FC players
Indian Super League players
Sudeva Delhi FC players
Kerala Blasters FC Reserves and Academy players
Rajasthan United FC players